Piner High School (PHS) is a Public high school in Santa Rosa, California, United States. It is part of the Santa Rosa High School District, which itself is a part of Santa Rosa City Schools.

History  
Piner High School was built in 1966 in Santa Rosa, California.
Piner High School has been opened with 10th, 11th, and 12th grades in the fall of 1966. It did not become a four-year high school until the early 1990s. The class of 1968 was the first graduating class of the school history. Prior to the first graduating class, William McCrossen, an adult, finished his high school education and was in fact the very first graduate of Piner High School. The class of 1975 was the last of the four-year classes until 1996 when Piner was re-established as a four-year high school to alleviate overcrowding of local middle schools.

Athletics 

Piner High School is a member of the North Bay League Oak and Redwood Divisions of the North Coast Section of the California Interscholastic Federation
Sports that Piner High offers are:
Badminton
Baseball
Basketball
Cross Country
Football
Golf (Men's and Women's)
Soccer
Softball
Swimming
Tennis (Men's and Women's)
Track and Field
Volleyball
Wrestling

Notable alumni
 Adrián González, soccer player

See also
List of school districts in Sonoma County, California

References

External links 
 Piner High School
 LA Galaxy II sign midfielder Adrian Gonzalez 

High schools in Santa Rosa, California
Educational institutions established in 1966
School buildings completed in 1966
Public high schools in California
1966 establishments in California